Blanzat is a commune in the Puy-de-Dôme department in Auvergne-Rhône-Alpes in central France.

Geography 

Population

See also
 Communes of the Puy-de-Dôme department

References

External links

 Official website 

Communes of Puy-de-Dôme